The 2022–23 All-Ireland Intermediate Club Hurling Championship was the 18th staging of the All-Ireland Intermediate Club Hurling Championship, the Gaelic Athletic Association's intermediate inter-county club hurling tournament. The draws for the respective provincial championships took place at various stages between June and September 2022. The championship ran from 30 October 2022 to 14 January 2023.

The All-Ireland final was played on 14 January 2023 at Croke Park in Dublin, between Monaleen from Limerick and Tooreen from Mayo, in what was their first ever meeting in the final. Monaleen won the match by 1-17 to 1-15 to become the first Limerick club to claim the title.

Bray Emmetts' Christy Moorehouse was the championship's top scorer with 0-44.

Team Summaries

Connacht Intermediate Club Hurling Championship

Connacht quarter-final

Connacht semi-final

Connacht final

Leinster Intermediate Club Hurling Championship

Leinster quarter-finals

Leinster semi-finals

Leinster final

Munster Intermediate Club Hurling Championship

Munster quarter-finals

Munster semi-finals

Munster final

Ulster Intermediate Club Hurling Championship

Ulster quarter-finals

Ulster semi-finals

Ulster final

All-Ireland Intermediate Club Hurling Championship

All-Ireland semi-finals

All-Ireland final

Championship statistics

Top scorers

Top scorer overall

In a single game

References

All-Ireland Intermediate Club Hurling Championship
All-Ireland Intermediate Club Hurling Championship
All-Ireland Intermediate Club Hurling Championship